Abantiades hyalinatus is a moth of the family Hepialidae. It is found in Australia, from southern Queensland to Tasmania.

The wingspan is 10–12 cm.

Gallery

References

Hepialidae
Moths described in 1853
Moths of Australia